Diuris basaltica, commonly known as little golden moths, or small golden moths is a species of orchid which is endemic to Victoria. The species has suffered a catastrophic reduction in range and distribution as a result of clearing for agriculture, then by urban expansion until only about four hundred plants remain in the wild.

Description
The flowers often do not open widely and lean downwards. The labellum has three lobes, the lateral ones small, wedge-shaped and pimply. Flowering occurs from September to October.

Taxonomy and naming
Diuris basaltica was first formally described in 2006 by David Jones and the description was published in Australian Orchid Review. The specific epithet (basaltica) is a Latin word referring to the soils derived from basalt in which this orchid grows.

Distribution and habitat
Little golden moths grows with kangaroo grass on eastern parts of the basalt plain to the west of Melbourne. The orchid once had a wider distribution on the volcanic plains of south-western Victoria but has suffered a catastrophic decline, firstly due to clearing of its habitat for agriculture and later by urbanisation.

Conservation
Diuris basaltica only survives in three populations, the largest of which includes about 400 plants on private property. Only five plants are conserved in a reserve and another two plants occur in the third population on private land. The main threats to the species are habitat loss, disturbance to or destruction of plants, grazing, weed invasion and altered fire regimes. The species is listed as "endangered" under the Victorian Flora and Fauna Guarantee Act 1988 and the Australian Government Environment Protection and Biodiversity Conservation Act 1999.

References

basaltica
Endemic orchids of Australia
Orchids of Victoria (Australia)
Plants described in 2006